Boris Kraigher (February 14, 1914 – January 4, 1967) was a Slovenian communist politician.

Kraigher served as the president of the Executive Council of the Socialist Republic of Slovenia from December 15, 1953 to June 25, 1962. He was a member of the League of Communists of Slovenia. He was preceded by Miha Marinko and succeeded by Viktor Avbelj.

References

Presidents of the Executive Council of the Socialist Republic of Slovenia
1914 births
1967 deaths
Recipients of the Order of the People's Hero
People from Styria (Slovenia)